Kiremetovo (Kirämät) is a rural locality (a village) in Novoburinsky Selsoviet, Krasnokamsky District, Bashkortostan, Russia. The population was 341 as of 2010. There are 5 streets.

Geography 
Kiremetovo is located 55 km southeast of Nikolo-Beryozovka (the district's administrative centre) by road. Kuyanovo is the nearest rural locality.

References 

Rural localities in Krasnokamsky District